The Sutton and Cheam by-election of 7 December 1972 was held after Conservative Member of Parliament (MP) Richard Sharples was appointed Governor of Bermuda. In a defeat for Edward Heath's government the seat was taken by the Liberals. This was the second Liberal gain during the 1970–1974 Parliament, during which they gained five seats overall.

Results

External links

Sutton and Cheam by-election
Sutton and Cheam by-election
Sutton and Cheam by-election
Sutton and Cheam,1972
Sutton and Cheam,1972
Sutton, London